Hu Binyuan (born November 7, 1977 in Shanghai) is a male Chinese sports shooter who competed in the 2004 Summer Olympics, 2008 Summer Olympics and the 2012 Summer Olympics.

He finished fourth at the 2004 double trap competition and won the bronze medal in the 2008 double trap competition.

References

External links
 
 

1977 births
Living people
Sport shooters from Shanghai
Olympic bronze medalists for China
Olympic shooters of China
Shooters at the 2004 Summer Olympics
Shooters at the 2008 Summer Olympics
Shooters at the 2012 Summer Olympics
Shooters at the 2016 Summer Olympics
Trap and double trap shooters
World record holders in shooting
Olympic medalists in shooting
Medalists at the 2008 Summer Olympics
Asian Games medalists in shooting
Shooters at the 1998 Asian Games
Shooters at the 2002 Asian Games
Shooters at the 2006 Asian Games
Shooters at the 2010 Asian Games
Shooters at the 2014 Asian Games
Chinese male sport shooters
Asian Games gold medalists for China
Asian Games silver medalists for China
Medalists at the 1998 Asian Games
Medalists at the 2002 Asian Games
Medalists at the 2006 Asian Games
Medalists at the 2010 Asian Games
Medalists at the 2014 Asian Games
20th-century Chinese people
21st-century Chinese people